Commander, or Knight Commander, is a title of honor prevalent in chivalric orders and fraternal orders.

The title of Commander occurred in the medieval military orders, such as the Knights Hospitaller, for a member senior to a Knight. Variations include Knight Commander, notably in English, sometimes used to denote an even higher rank than Commander. In some orders of chivalry, Commander ranks above  (i.e.

France

History
In the Modern Age, the French Kings created chivalric orders which mimicked the military order's ranks.

 The Order of the Holy Spirit, created in 1578 by king Henry III, had two categories of commanders.
 Ecclesiastical commanders: members of the clergy with the rank of prelate. They were eight, but the grand almoner of the King was counted as a supplementary ecclesiastical commander .
 Administrative officers: the "officers-commanders" were the four most important executive officers of the order. They had the same rank as lay knights, but they needed not to prove their nobility. The officers-commanders were sometimes called grand officers, in order to distinguished them from the lowest rank of officers.
 The Order of Saint Louis, created in 1694 by King , had one rank of commanders. This was the second highest rank of the order, destined to honor military officers. They were only 24 commanders at a time, eventually promoted to the rank of Grand Cross.

Both orders were suppressed in 1830 by the new King .

Modern merit orders

This rank was renamed Commander by King  in 1816 in order to bring the Napoleonic order on monarchical guidelines. This is still the third highest rank of the order.
 The , created in 1963 by President , has the same rank structure as the Legion of Honor. The Commanders form the third highest rank of the order.
 The , created in 1808 for teachers and professors, has Commander as its highest rank since reorganization in 1955 by President .
 The Order of Agricultural Merit, created in 1883 for contributions to agriculture, has Commander as its highest rank since reorganization in 1900.
 The  has had Commander as its highest rank since its creation in 1930.
 The  has Commander as its highest rank since its creation in 1957.

Italy 
The Italian government's orders are exceptional to the international standard in that they do not officially have special ranks or decorations for females (Dames).

The Republic of Italy officially recognizes the orders and titles conferred upon its citizens from the Holy See and from some of the royal houses of Italy.

 is also the Italian translation for the rank of Knight Commander in foreign orders, such as the Order of the British Empire.

In the movie The Godfather Part III, Michael Corleone is addressed as  Michael Corleone on his return to Sicily since he received a Papal order of knighthood.

Germany 
In German,  (derived from ) was a rank within military orders, especially the Teutonic Knights. In the State of the Teutonic Order, the Komtur was the commander of a basic administrative division called  (also ). A Komtur was responsible for feeding and supporting the Order's Knights from the yield of local estates. He commanded several Procurators. A  had a convent of at least 12 brothers. Various  formed a  province.

In postwar Germany the ranks of the Order of Merit were named with totally new terms. The equivalent to a commander is the Great Cross of Merit and the equivalent to a Knight Commander is the Great Cross of Merit with the Star and Slash

Papal orders 

As for the Papal orders, it is also applied in the Sovereign Military Order of Malta (in its  bestowed for merit) and the Order of the Holy Sepulchre.

United Kingdom 

United Kingdom is distinguished by its use of differentiating Commander and Knight or Dame Commander.

Knight Commander or Dame Commander is the second most senior grade of seven orders of chivalry, three of which are dormant (and one of them continues as a German house order). The rank entails admission into knighthood, allowing the recipient to use the title 'Sir' (male) or 'Dame' (female) before his or her name. In the Commonwealth Realms orders and decorations, Knight Commander and Dame Commander rank before Knights Bachelor but after the Order of the Companions of Honour, although Companions of Honour obtain no knighthood or other status.

In the Royal Victorian Order and the Order of the British Empire, the grade of Commander is senior to the grade of Lieutenant or Officer respectively, but junior to that of Knight Commander or Dame Commander. In the British Venerable Order of Saint John, a Commander ranks below a Knight. However, Knights of the Venerable Order of St John are not entitled Sir.

The orders that award the rank of Knight Commander, and related post-nominal letters, are as follows (dormant orders in italics):
 Order of the Bath (KCB/DCB)
 Order of the Star of India (KCSI)
 Order of St Michael and St George (KCMG/DCMG)
 Order of the Indian Empire (KCIE)
 Royal Victorian Order (KCVO/DCVO)
 Order of the British Empire (KBE/DBE)

Knights Commander and Dames Commander rank behind the most senior rank in each order, that of Knight Grand Cross. The third most senior rank in each order is a Companion (CB, CSI, CMG, CIE), Knight (KH) or Commander (CVO, CBE). Insignia include a breast star, a badge, and a ribbon.

Spain 
In military orders with extensive territorial possessions, individual estates could be called  and entrusted to an individual knight, as a  fief. Apart from cases where such a fief was  linked to a higher office within the order, his style would then be ; this etymology is best preserved in the Spanish form , important in the military orders involved in the Reconquista such as the Order of Santiago.

See also 
 Grand Master (order)

References

Orders of chivalry
Honorary titles